Eileen Lucy "Tirzah" Garwood (11 April 1908 – 27 March 1951) was a British artist and engraver, a member of the Great Bardfield Artists. The artist Eric Ravilious was her husband from 1930 until his death in 1942.

Early life
Garwood was born in 1908 in Gillingham, Kent, the third of five children. Her father Frederick Scott Garwood (1872–1944) was an officer in the Royal Engineers. Her name "Tirzah" was bestowed by her siblings, a reference to Tirzah in the Book of Numbers in the Bible, and possibly a corruption of a reference by her grandmother to "Little Tertia", that is, the third child.  She and her family accompanied her father on army postings to Croydon, Littlehampton and then Eastbourne.

Garwood was educated at West Hill School in Eastbourne from 1920 to 1924, and then at Eastbourne School of Art from 1925, under Reeves Fawkes, Oliver Senior and, as a wood engraver, Eric Ravilious. She moved to Kensington in 1928. She later studied at the Central School of Art.

One of Garwood's early woodcuts, shown at the Society of Wood Engravers' annual exhibition in 1927, was praised in The Times. She undertook commissions for the Kynoch Press and for the BBC, for whom she produced a new rendering of their coat-of-arms. In 1928 Garwood illustrated Granville Bantock's oratorio The Pilgrim's Progress, which he wrote as a BBC commission.

Life with Eric Ravilious
Garwood married Eric Ravilious in Kensington in July 1930. Between 1930 and 1932 the couple lived in Hammersmith, London, where there is a blue plaque on the wall of their house at the corner of Upper Mall and Weltje Road. In 1931 they moved to rural Essex where they initially lodged with Edward Bawden and his wife Charlotte at Great Bardfield. In 1933 they painted murals at the Midland Hotel in Morecambe.

In 1934 they purchased Bank House at Castle Hedingham, in Essex, and a blue plaque now commemorates this. They had three children: John Ravilious (1935–2014); the photographer James Ravilious (1939–1999); and Anne Ullmann (b. 1941), editor of books on her parents and their work. After Anne was born in April 1941, the family moved out of the often cold, and sometimes flooded, Bank House to Ironbridge Farm near Shalford, Essex. During the winter of 1941 Garwood became ill; she was diagnosed with breast cancer and underwent emergency mastectomy surgery in March 1942.  She wrote her autobiography from March and May 1942, while recovering from the surgery. Originally intended only for her family, the autobiography, Long Live Great Bardfield & Love to You All, was published posthumously, in 2012, after being edited by her daughter Anne.

While he was travelling for a commission from the War Artists' Advisory Committee, Eric Ravilious's plane went missing off Iceland; it was later determined that he died in a plane crash on 2 September 1942.  His body was never recovered.  The government proved reluctant to pay Garwood the widow's pension she was due or to settle Ravilious's outstanding pay for over a year.

Later life
Garwood left Ironbridge in March 1944, and moved with her children to Boydells Farm, near Wethersfield, Essex.  She began painting in oils and resumed her career as an artist.  Garwood met the Anglo-Irish radio producer Henry Swanzy in 1944, and they were married in March 1946. They lived in Hampstead.

She was again diagnosed with cancer in early 1948, and lived in a nursing home near Colchester from 1950, where she died in 1951.  She was buried in Copford.

A memorial exhibition was held at the Towner Gallery in Eastbourne in 1952.  Two of her paintings are in the Towner Gallery, which also has the largest collection of Ravilious' work. Both also have works in the Fry Art Gallery in Saffron Walden. Additionally, one of her prints is held by the Victoria & Albert Museum in London. She was painted by Ravilious, in Two Women in a Garden (1936), alongside Charlotte Bawden.

Bibliography

References

External links 

 
 Long Live Great Bardfield: The Fry Art Gallery celebrates the life, loves and art of Tirzah Garwood (includes photograph of Garwood)

1908 births
1951 deaths
20th-century British printmakers
20th-century English painters
20th-century English women artists
Alumni of the Central School of Art and Design
Deaths from breast cancer
Deaths from cancer in England
English wood engravers
English women painters
People from Hammersmith
People from Castle Hedingham
People from Gillingham, Kent
Women engravers
20th-century engravers